Galder Gaztelu-Urrutia (born 17 February 1974) is a Spanish film and advertising director and producer. He made his feature-film debut with, The Platform (2019), a dystopian science fiction-horror film.

Early life and education
Gaztelu-Urrutia was born on 17 February 1974 in Bilbao. He completed a B.A. in business management with a specialization in international trade.

Career
He made a short film, 913 in 2003. He has directed commercials. In 2011, he made The House on the Lake. His feature film debut was in 2019 with the dystopian science fiction-horror film The Platform (its Spanish title is El hoyo, transl. The Hole). About the film, he said the point is "it isn’t about a war between those above and those below — we all have someone above us and someone below us".

In February 2023, Deadline announced his next film will be a thriller entitled "Rich Flu", starring Mary Elizabeth Winstead and Jonah Hauer-King.

Influences and style
Gaztelu-Urrutia has named Dante's Divine Comedy as one of his literary influences for The Platform, as well as films such as Buñuel's The Exterminating Angel (1962), Jeunet's Delicatessen (1991), Ridley Scott's Blade Runner (1982) and Scorsese's Taxi Driver (1976).

Filmography

Feature films

Short films

Awards
The Platform won the People's Choice Award for Midnight Madness at the Toronto Film Festival, and garnered four honours at the Sitges Film Festival: Best Film, Best New Director, Best Special Effects and the Audience Award.

References

1974 births
Living people
Spanish film directors
Spanish film producers
People from Bilbao
Film directors from the Basque Country (autonomous community)